Two's a Crowd may refer to:

 Two's a Crowd (TV series), a 1978 Canadian situation comedy
 "Two's a Crowd" (Superman: The Animated Series), a 1997 episode of Superman: The Animated Series
 "Two's a Crowd", a 1965 episode of The Avengers
 "Two's a Crowd", a 1978 episode of All in the Family
 "Two's a Crowd", a 2000 episode of Ally McBeal